Unión Deportiva Los Barrios is a Spanish football team based in Los Barrios, Province of Cádiz, in the autonomous community of Andalusia. Founded in 1993, it plays in Tercera División – Group 10. The team holds home games at Estadio San Rafael, with a 2,500-seat capacity. 

In December 2017, Los Barrios was taken over by Heritage Sports Holdings, a group owned by Paul Collado, Pablo Dana and former Real Madrid defender Michel Salgado. The takeover also includes a link with Gibraltar United of the Gibraltar Premier Division, a club which is also owned by Heritage Sports Holdings.

Season to season

22 seasons in Tercera División
1 season in Tercera División RFEF

Notable players
 Liam Walker

References

External links
lapreferente.com profile 

Football clubs in Andalusia
Association football clubs established in 1993
1993 establishments in Spain
Los Barrios